Zebbie D. Lethridge Jr. (born January 31, 1975) is a former American football cornerback in the National Football League. He played college football at Texas Tech where he was a quarterback.

He began his pro football career as an undrafted free agent with the Dallas Cowboys in 1998 but was cut before the regular season; he again participated in Cowboys training camp in 1999 but did not make final roster cuts. In 2000, Lethridge played in 10 games for the Berlin Thunder of NFL Europe. Signing with the Miami Dolphins as a free agent on April 26, 2001, Lethridge played in two games with the Dolphins that year. Lethridge was on injured reserve in the early weeks of the 2002 season before being waived on September 17.

References

1975 births
Living people
American football cornerbacks
American football safeties
American football quarterbacks
Texas Tech Red Raiders football players
Miami Dolphins players
Berlin Thunder players
Sportspeople from Lubbock, Texas
Players of American football from Texas